Daniel Putnam King (January 8, 1801 – July 25, 1850) was a U.S. Representative from Massachusetts.

Early life and education
Born in South Danvers, Massachusetts, now Peabody, Massachusetts King pursued classical studies, graduated from Harvard University in 1823 and he also studied law.

Business career
Although he studied law, King was not a practicing attorney, instead he engaged in agricultural pursuits.

Service in the Massachusetts Legislature
King served as member of the Massachusetts House of Representatives in 1836 and 1837.
King served in the Massachusetts State Senate from 1838 to 1841, and was its President in 1840.  King was again a member of the Massachusetts House in 1843 and 1844 and served as Speaker in the latter year.

Congressional service
King was elected as a Whig to the Twenty-eighth and to the three succeeding Congresses and served from March 4, 1843, until his death on July 25, 1850. King served as chairman of the Committee on Expenditures on Public Buildings (Twenty-eighth Congress), Committee on Accounts (Twenty-ninth through Thirty-first Congresses), Committee on Revolutionary Claims (Thirtieth Congress).

Death and burial
King died in South Danvers, on July 25, 1850, he was interred in King Cemetery in Peabody.

See also
 61st Massachusetts General Court (1840)
 62nd Massachusetts General Court (1841)
 64th Massachusetts General Court (1843)
List of United States Congress members who died in office (1790–1899)

References

1801 births
1850 deaths
Members of the Massachusetts House of Representatives
Speakers of the Massachusetts House of Representatives
Massachusetts state senators
Presidents of the Massachusetts Senate
Harvard University alumni
Whig Party members of the United States House of Representatives from Massachusetts
19th-century American politicians